Mercury was launched at Calcutta in 1806. 

On 5 April 1807 Mercury Packet, Taylor, master, arrived at Falmouth. She had left Bengal on 24 November 1806 and St Helena on 5 February 1806. Mercury Packet arrived at Gravesend on 13 April. She sailed for India on 12 April.

In 1819 her owners were Fairlie & Co., and her master was J.J.R.Bowman. In November 1818 the British East India Company's (EIC) hired armed ship Mercury, Captain John James Robson Bowman, sailed with the expedition to the Straits of Malacca under Stamford Raffles. She then participated in the occupation of Singapore. Her charter expired in February 1819. Mercury was sold at Java in 1822.

Notes, citations, and references
Notes

Citations

References
 

1806 ships
British ships built in India
Ships of the British East India Company
Age of Sail merchant ships of England